John Elian García Sossa (born 13 April 2000), also known as John García, is a Bolivian professional footballer who plays as a midfielder for the Bolivia national football team.

Professional career
On 24 May 2017, García Sossa signed with Huachipato in Chile from his local club Calleja.

On 31 March 2018, García made his debut with the senior team in Primera División in a 2–0 home win against Everton, coming on as a 63rd-minute substitute for Joaquín Verdugo. | Debutó en Copa Libertadores de América 2021 con Club Bolívar en Uruguay|

International career
García Sossa made his international debut for the Bolivia national football team in a 1–1 friendly tie with Curaçao on 23 March 2018. 
|Club Bolívar  | Copa Libertadores de América 2021| Club Bolívar |Copa Tigo 2021 Liga Boliviana |

References

External links
 Soccerway Profile
 NFT Profile
 Juegos Bolivarianos Profile

2000 births
Living people
Sportspeople from Santa Cruz de la Sierra
Bolivian footballers
Bolivia international footballers
C.D. Huachipato footballers
Deportes La Serena footballers
Oriente Petrolero players
Chilean Primera División players
Bolivian Primera División players
Association football midfielders
Bolivian expatriate footballers
Bolivian expatriate sportspeople in Chile
Expatriate footballers in Chile
Bolivia youth international footballers